The drabsha or darfash is the symbol of the Mandaean faith. It is typically translated as 'banner'.

Etymology
The Mandaic term drabša is derived from the Persian word dirafsh, which means 'banner or standard; a flash of light; sunrise'. In Mandaic, drabša can also mean 'a ray or beam of light'.

Description and symbolism
The drabsha (drabša) is a banner in the shape of a cross made of two branches of olive wood fastened together and half covered with a piece of white cloth traditionally made of pure silk, and seven branches of myrtle. The drabsha white silk banner is not identified with the Christian cross. Instead, the four arms of the drabsha symbolize the four corners of the universe, while the pure silk cloth represents the Light of God (Hayyi Rabbi). The seven branches of myrtle represent the seven days of creation. The drabsha is viewed as a symbol of light and the light of the sun, moon and stars is envisaged to shine from it. It may be of pre-Christian origin and used originally to hang a prayer shawl during immersion in the river (masbuta).

Prayers
In E. S. Drower's version of the Qolasta, prayers 330–347 (corresponding to Part 4 of Mark Lidzbarski's Oxford Collection) are dedicated to the drabsha.

Gallery

See also
Kushta
Rasta (Mandaeism), white ritual clothing used by Mandaeans
Temple menorah, represents light of God and symbolizes creation in seven days

References

External links
Preparing the drabsha (video)

Mandaean religious objects
Symbols of Abrahamic religions
Mandaic words and phrases